Events from the year 1959 in Scotland.

Incumbents 

 Secretary of State for Scotland and Keeper of the Great Seal –  John Maclay

Law officers 
 Lord Advocate – William Rankine Milligan
 Solicitor General for Scotland – William Grant

Judiciary 
 Lord President of the Court of Session and Lord Justice General – Lord Clyde
 Lord Justice Clerk – Lord Thomson
 Chairman of the Scottish Land Court – Lord Gibson

Events 
 1 January – 5 members of the Universal Hiking Club of Glasgow die in a storm in the Grampians.
 9 January – Clyde-built fisheries protection vessel Freya founders off Caithness with the loss of 3 of her crew of 20.
 28 January – a Glasgow Corporation Tramways tramcar collides with a lorry and catches fire in Shettleston Road with 3 killed.
 2 May – the Chapelcross nuclear power station opens.
 4 July – British Railways close their Kilmarnock Works.
 18 September – Auchengeich mining disaster: 47 miners die as the result of an underground fire at Auchengeich Colliery, Lanarkshire.
 8 October – United Kingdom general election results in a record third successive Conservative victory. Harold Macmillan increases the Conservative majority to 100 seats across the UK but the Unionist Party in Scotland loses 4 seats.
 14 November – the nuclear Dounreay fast reactor achieves criticality.
 17 November – Prestwick and Renfrew Airports become the first in the U.K. with duty-free shops.
 6 December – Aberdeen trawler George Robb runs aground at Duncansby Head in a severe gale with the loss of all 12 crew.
 7 December – Leith coaster Servus runs aground below Dunbeath Castle; her crew are rescued by life-boat.
 8 December – Broughty Ferry life-boat Mona capsizes on service to North Carr Lightship with the loss of all 8 of the life-boat crew.
 William Theodore Heard is elevated to cardinal, the first Scot to hold such an office since the Reformation.
 St. Cuthbert's Co-operative Society opens Scotland's first supermarket in Edinburgh.
 North of Scotland Hydro-Electric Board's Sloy-Awe Hydro-Electric Power Scheme becomes fully operational; and peat-fired generating station at Altnabreac opened.
 North Highland College established.
 The fossil ichthyosaur Dearcmhara is first discovered by Brian Shawcross on the Trotternish peninsula of Skye.

Births 
 31 January – Heather Anderson, SNP politician
 12 April – Jackson Carlaw, Conservative politician. leader of the Scottish Conservatives
 16 April – Alison Ramsay, field hockey player
 27 April – Sheena Easton, singer
 27 May – Gerard Kelly, television and pantomime actor (died 2010 in London)
 9 July – Jim Kerr, rock singer-songwriter
 16 July – James MacMillan, composer
 27 July – Siobhan Redmond, actress
 28 July – Lorraine Fullbrook, Conservative politician
 31 July – Andrew Marr, print and television journalist
 29 August – Eddi Reader, folk singer-songwriter
 7 September – Rona Munro, dramatist and screenwriter
 8 September – Judy Murray, tennis player and coach
 10 October – Mark Johnston, racehorse trainer
 25 November – Charles Kennedy, leader of the Liberal Democrats (died 2015)
 30 November – Lorraine Kelly, television presenter
date unknown
 Meg Bateman, Gaelic writer and poet
 Robert Crawford, poet and literary scholar
 Andy Gray, actor (died 2021)
 Alexander Stoddart, sculptor

Deaths 
 2 July – William Weir, 1st Viscount Weir, industrialist and politician (born 1877)
 1 October – Evelyn Vida Baxter, ornithologist (born 1879)
 15 November – Charles Thomson Rees Wilson, physicist, Nobel Prize laureate (born 1869)
 25 November – Robert Smyth McColl, footballer and retail store founder (born 1876)

The arts
 Jane Duncan's first novel My Friends the Miss Boyds is published by Macmillan.

See also 
 1959 in Northern Ireland

References 

 
Scotland
Years of the 20th century in Scotland
1950s in Scotland